English glam rock singer Gary Glitter (born Paul Francis Gadd) has released 7 studio albums, 4 live albums, 13 compilation albums, 1 extended play (EP) and 42 singles, including 3 UK number-one singles.

Albums

Studio albums

Live albums

Compilation albums

Singles

1970s

1980s

1990s

2000s

2010s

References

External links

Discography
Rock music discographies
Discographies of British artists